Diphros (Greek: Δίφρος) was an Ancient Greek stool without back and with four turned legs. It was easily transportable and so in common use. Gods are shown sitting on diphroi on the Parthenon frieze; women used them in their
home. The foldable diphros was called δίφρος ὀκλαδίας diphros okladias. Diphros was also called the saddle of
chariot-board, on which two could stand, the driver ἡνίοχος heniochos and the combatant παραιβάτης paraibatês. These objects are only part of the larger body of ancient furniture attested to in texts and images.

References
A Handbook of Greek Art  by Gisela M. A. Richter
Hesperia  by American School of Classical Studies at Athens
Diphros (furniture) Encyclopædia Britannica
Furniture of Ancient Greece  by A. Whitham
Daidalos and the Origins of Greek Art  by Sarah P. Morris
Diphros in Google Images

Ancient Greek culture
Chairs